This is a list of episodes for the You're Under Arrest anime.

OVA

Theme songs
Openings

Lyricist: Takeshi Yokoyama / Composer: Takashi Shoji / Arranger: Ryo Yonemitsu / Singers: Sakiko Tamagawa + Akiko Hiramatsu

Endings

Lyricist: Anju Mana / Composer: Takashi Shoji / Arranger: Ryo Yonemitsu / Singers: Sakiko Tamagawa + Akiko Hiramatsu

Television series

Theme Songs
Openings

November 2, 1996 - March 22, 1997
Lyricist: Takashi Hamasaki / Composer: FLYING KIDS / Arranger: FLYING KIDS / Singers: FLYING KIDS
FILE.5-25
"LOVE SOMEBODY"
April 5, 1997 - September 27, 1997
Lyricist: Takeshi Yokoyama / Composer: H^L / Arranger: H^L / Singers: Mariko Fukui
FILE.26-51

Endings
"Thank you,love"
November 2, 1996 - March 22, 1997
Lyricist: Keiko Terada / Composer: Shinji Kakijima / Arranger: Itaru Watanabe / Singers: Keiko Terada
FILE.5-25

April 5, 1997 - September 27, 1997
Lyricist: Takako Shirai / Composer: Takako Shirai / Arranger: Takako Shirai & River of Dreams / Singers: Takako Shirai
FILE.26-51

TV Specials

Theme Songs
Openings
"BRAND NEW DAY"
Lyricist: Yuko Matsuzaki / Composer: Kazuhiro Hara / Arranger: Kazuhiro Hara / Singers: Mariko Fukui

Endings

Lyricist: Shoko Sawada / Composer: Shoko Sawada / Arranger: Hiroshi Uesugi / Singers: emiko

You're Under Arrest (2001)

Theme Songs
Openings
"starting UP"
Lyricist: Juria Matsuda / Composer: Kazuhiro Hara / Arranger: Miki Watanabe / Singers: Juria Matsuda

Endings
"Blooming Days"
Lyricist: Takako Shirai / Composer: Takako Shirai / Arranger: Takako Shirai / Singers: Takako Shirai

OVA Special

Theme Songs
Openings
"Special Day"
Lyricist: Yuko Matsuzaki / Composer: Little Voice / Arranger: Yuta Yamashita / Singers: Sakiko Tamagawa & Akiko Hiramatsu

Endings
"Promise"
Lyricist: Takeshi Yokoyama / Composer: Little Voice / Arranger: N^T / Singers: Mariko Fukui

Drama

You're Under Arrest: Full Throttle

DVD Episode

Theme Songs
Openings

Lyricist: AA & CHINO / Composer: Shina Nagano (TWO-MIX) / Arranger: Suzuki Daichi Hideyuki / Singers: AA & CHINO

Endings

Lyricist: Chiaki Ishikawa / Composer: Chiaki Ishikawa / Arranger: Masara Nishida / Singers: Chiaki Ishikawa of See-saw

References

Episodes
You're Under Arrest